Ray MacDonnell (March 5, 1928 – June 10, 2021) was an American actor, best known for his role as Dr. Joe Martin, patriarch of the Martin family, on the daytime soap opera All My Children, a role he played for 40 years.

Early years 
MacDonnell was born on March 5, 1928, in Lawrence, Massachusetts. He attended Amherst College subsequently receiving a Fulbright Scholarship to London's Royal Academy of Dramatic Arts.

Career 
MacDonnell received a Daytime Emmy Award for Lifetime Achievement in 2004. Prior to appearing on All My Children, he played Philip Capice on the soap The Edge of Night from 1961 to 69. Other credits included Mame on Broadway from 1966 to 1970, and as Dick Tracy in 1967.

In 2009, MacDonnell retired from All My Children. Production of the show moved from New York to California, marking the end of his 40-year run. His retirement from All My Children left Susan Lucci, portrayer of Erica Kane, as the only original cast member on the show. In 2011, it was announced that MacDonnell along with on-screen wife, Lee Meriwether as Ruth Martin, would be making a limited return to All My Children. MacDonnell also returned to All My Children for its finale which aired on September 23, 2011.

Personal life and death
In 1961, MacDonnell married Patricia Anne Broderick. They had three children- Sarah, Kyle, and Daniel.

He died at his home in Chappaqua, New York, on June 10, 2021, at the age of 93.

References

External links

Obituary

1928 births
2021 deaths
American expatriates in the United Kingdom
American male film actors
American male soap opera actors
Amherst College alumni
Male actors from Massachusetts
People from Lawrence, Massachusetts